Willy C. Shih is an American economist currently the Robert and Jane Cizik Professor of Management Practice in Business Administration at Harvard Business School.

References

Year of birth missing (living people)
Living people
Harvard Business School faculty
American economists
Place of birth missing (living people)
Massachusetts Institute of Technology alumni
University of California, Berkeley alumni